The 2011 IAAF Road Race Label Events were the fourth edition of the global series of road running competitions given Label status by the International Association of Athletics Federations (IAAF). All five World Marathon Majors had Gold Label status. The series included a total of 65 road races: 26 Gold, 25 Silver and 14 Bronze. In terms of distance, 39 races were marathons, 13 were half marathons, 9 were 10K runs, and 4 were held over other distances.

The Yokohama Women's Marathon featured twice in the series, as the 2010 event was delayed from November to February 2011 due to a schedule clash with the APEC Japan 2010 meeting, also held in Yokohama.

Races

References

Race calendar
Calendar 2011 IAAF Label Road Races. IAAF. Retrieved 2019-09-22.

2011
IAAF Road Race Label Events